The Last Rocket is the debut studio album by American rapper Takeoff and his only solo release during his lifetime. It was released on November 2, 2018, by Capitol Records, Motown and Quality Control Music. First announced through a private party in Los Angeles, California on October 23, 2018, the album's release made Takeoff the second member of Migos to release a solo album, following Quavo's Quavo Huncho in October 2018 and preceding Offset's Father of 4 the following year.

Background
Throughout 2018, all three members of Migos began pursuing solo careers, with Quavo being the first member to release a solo album, releasing Quavo Huncho in October. In the previous year, Offset released a collaborative album with 21 Savage and Metro Boomin titled Without Warning. Takeoff became the second member to announce a solo album on October 23, at a private listening party held in Los Angeles. The title of the album was announced to be The Last Rocket, and Takeoff confirmed it would include production from longtime Migos collaborator DJ Durel. A track named "Infatuation" was announced to be on the album. Two days later, he released his first single off the album, "Last Memory", along with the music video.

Critical reception

The Last Rocket was met with widespread critical acclaim. At Metacritic, which assigns a normalized rating out of 100 to reviews from mainstream publications, the album received an average score of 82, based on six reviews.

In a positive review, Clayton Tomlinson of Exclaim! praised The Last Rocket for its "themes, storytelling and is a powerful example of Takeoff's skills as a rapper", noting it as a superior solo effort than fellow Migos member Quavo's debut album Quavo Huncho. Hip hop magazine XXL wrote that "Although large swaths of the lyrical content here could slip seamlessly onto a Migos project, Takeoff's nimble flow and dextrous wordplay is a treat. From a pure rapping perspective, Takeoff is establishing himself as Migos' most dangerous weapon, for however much that's worth". Sam Moore of NME commended the album's runtime and Takeoff's performance: "The record's 35-minute duration feels typical of Takeoff's more humble approach to business, and, while he does occasionally play it rather safe (see the by-the-numbers brag'n'trap of "Soul Plane" and the drowsy lead single "Last Memory"), his debut solo album still manages to more or less prove that, given the chance, Takeoff is capable of standing out on his own." Daniel Spielberger of HipHopDX concluded: "With its brevity and risk-taking, The Last Rocket succeeds at illustrating Takeoff's talents. Though there's no outright banger and some filler, this solo album serves as a glimmer of hope for the longevity of hip hop's current favorite trio."

In a negative review, Trey Alston of Highsnobiety criticized Takeoff's lack of individuality in comparison to other Migos members: "Takeoff's dull delivery, uninspired bars, and mostly uniform beats make what could have been the album that fueled the fire of diehard fans instead a body of work that confirms the critical consensus. The Last Rocket is a scary indicator that either Takeoff is scared to reinvent the wheel so he's trying it in small doses, or there really isn't any stone left unturned for him and Migos on the whole. There are hints of brilliance here that if expanded upon, showcase that there's some hope for Migos yet. But Takeoff's latest is more yawn-inducing than mesmerizing on all fronts; in rap, that's like signing a death warrant on your career. And this is a debut solo album, for Christ's sake. It looks like that rocket is lost in the atmosphere; let's just hope it doesn't come crashing back down."

Commercial performance
The Last Rocket debuted at number four on the US Billboard 200 with 49,000 album-equivalent units (including 5,000 in pure album sales). Two songs from the album managed to chart on the US Billboard Hot 100; "Last Memory" peaked at number 54, while "Casper" charted at number 99.

Track listing

Notes
 "She Gon Wink" features vocals by Quavo
 "Infatuation" features vocals by Dayytona Fox

Charts

Release history

References

2018 debut albums
Takeoff (rapper) albums
Quality Control Music albums
Albums produced by Cubeatz
Albums produced by Murda Beatz
Albums produced by TM88